Polar Park is an animal park in the municipality of Bardu in Troms county, Norway. The park opened on 18 June 1994, displaying animals in their natural habitat. It also notes that it is the world's "most northern animal park."

The park specializes in Nordic fauna, including Norway's four largest predators: brown bear, lynx, wolf, and wolverine. There are also moose, muskox, red deer, and reindeer. In October 2015, hunters accidentally wandered into the park's area and shot two red deer. As of July 2019, the number of each species resident in the park are listed on the park's website as follows:

Gallery 
Photos from the park:

References

External links 

Bardu
Wildlife parks
1994 establishments in Norway